Cristina Vitali (born February 15, 1975 in Bergamo) is an Italian sport shooter. She competed at the 2000 Summer Olympics in the women's skeet event, in which she tied for 11th place.

References

1975 births
Living people
Skeet shooters
Italian female sport shooters
Shooters at the 2000 Summer Olympics
Olympic shooters of Italy